Mikhaylovka is a rural locality (a selo) in Krasnoyarovsky Selsoviet of Mazanovsky District, Amur Oblast, Russia. The population was 106 as of 2018. There are 2 streets.

Geography 
Mikhaylovka is located on the right bank of the Birma River, 39 km southwest of Novokiyevsky Uval (the district's administrative centre) by road. Petrovka is the nearest rural locality.

References 

Rural localities in Mazanovsky District